Ghaleb is a given name. Notable people with the name include:

Ghaleb Awwali, Lebanese Islamic Jihad official assassinated in a car bombing in Beirut in 2004
Ghaleb Moussa Abdalla Bader (born 1951), Jordanian Roman Catholic bishop, Archbishop emeritus of the Roman Catholic Archdiocese of Algiers
Ghaleb Barakat (1927–2014), Jordanian politician and diplomat
Ghaleb Bencheikh (born 1960), Doctor of Science and physics from Jeddah, Saudi Arabia
Ibrahim Ghaleb (born 1990), Saudi Arabian footballer
Mohammed Murad Ghaleb (1922–2007), Egyptian politician and diplomat who studied medicine at Cairo University
Seifollah Ghaleb (born 1916), Egyptian sports shooter
Ali Ghaleb Himmat (born 1938), Italian businessman
Ghaleb Husseini, Chemical Engineering professor at the American University of Sharjah
Ghaleb Majadele (born 1953), Israeli Arab politician
Ghaleb Rida (born 1981), professional Lebanese basketball player
Ghaleb Zubi (born 1943), Jordanian lawyer and politician in the Hashemite Kingdom of Jordan

See also
Mit Abou Ghaleb, a village in Damietta Governorate, Egypt
Sarollah Shah-e Ghaleb, a village in Khuzestan Province, Iran
Shah Ghaleb, a village in Boyer-Ahmad Province, Iran
Galeb (disambiguation)
Ghale